Jaroslav Prekop  (born 8 August 1979) is a Slovak footballer who recently played as midfielder.

External links

1979 births
Living people
Slovak footballers
Association football midfielders
Czech First League players
SK Sigma Olomouc players
AS Trenčín players
1. FC Tatran Prešov players
Liga I players
CS Gaz Metan Mediaș players
FK Dukla Banská Bystrica players
Expatriate footballers in Romania
Sportspeople from Piešťany